Samuel Allen Carson (June 3, 1870 – February 27, 1949) was a politician from Alberta, Canada. He served in the Legislative Assembly of Alberta from 1921 to 1935 as a member of the United Farmers of Alberta.

Political career
Carson first ran for a seat to the Alberta Legislature in the 1921 general election as a United Farmers candidate. He defeated incumbent MLA John Boyle in the electoral district of Sturgeon. (Boyle also ran for a seat in Edmonton, which he won.)

Carson ran for a second term in the 1926 Alberta general election and easily won the three-way race as the opposition vote collapsed.

Carson ran for a third term in the 1930 Alberta general election and held his seat with a big majority over Liberal candidate John Kuzek.

Carson retired from the Legislature at dissolution in 1935.

References

External links
Legislative Assembly of Alberta Members Listing

United Farmers of Alberta MLAs
1870 births
1949 deaths
Calgary city councillors